The South Saqqara Stone is the lid of the sarcophagus of the ancient Egyptian queen Ankhenespepi, which was inscribed with a list for the reigns of the pharaohs of the 6th Dynasty from Teti, Userkare, Pepi I, Merenre to the early years of Pepi II under whom the document was likely created. It is essentially an annal document which records events in each year of a king's reign; unfortunately, it was reused in antiquity for Ankhesenpepi I's burial and many of its invaluable inscriptions have been erased.

Discovery
The South Saqqara Stone was discovered in 1932–33 by Gustave Jéquier in the westernmost of five storerooms south of the pyramid of Queen Iput II, within the pyramid complex of Pepi II (during whose reign it was created) at Saqqara.

Description
Made of basalt, it measures 2.43 metres by 0.92 metres and is 20 centimetres thick. It is inscribed on both sides, but much of the inscription is erased and unreadable. The recto appears to list events of the reigns of  Teti, Userkare, Pepi I and Merenre, the verso describes the second part of the reign of Merenra and part of Pepi II's.

Significance
The importance of the South Saqqara Stone stems from its inscription: a list of a number of  pharaohs, along with details of annual or biannual cattle counts which confirm details in other sources (such as the Turin King List), and allow archaeologists to estimate the length of their reigns. Michel Baud and Vassil Dobrev estimate at least 12 years of reign for Teti, 2-4 years for Userkare, 49-50 years for Pepi I and, at least, 11–13 years for Merenre based on an estimate on the size of the preserved year the size of each year blocks and the location of certain cattle counts (such as the Year of the 18th and 25th counts for Pepi I and his Year after the 23rd count, or the Year of and the Year after the 2nd count for Merenre) within this document. 

The Stone is considered one of the earliest historical documents in existence, as it is not merely a list of dynastic ancestors for the ruling pharaoh, but includes the names of all preceding pharaohs known to the artefact's creators, including shadowy rulers such as Userkare.

See also 
 Saqqara King List

References
Michel Baud, Vassil Dobrev, De nouvelles annales de l'Ancien Empire égyptien. Une "Pierre de Palerme" pour la VIe dynastie, BIFAO 95 (1995), pp.23-92

23rd-century BC inscriptions
1932 archaeological discoveries
Ancient Egyptian King lists
Ancient Egyptian stelas
Sarcophagi
Pepi II Neferkare